Kürkün (also, Kyurkyun) is a village and municipality in the Quba Rayon of Azerbaijan.  It had a population of 349 in 2009.

References 

Populated places in Quba District (Azerbaijan)